The Culver PQ-14 Cadet is a modified version of the Culver LFA Cadet used as a target drone.

In  1940, the U.S. Army Air Corps drew up a requirement for a radio-controlled target drone for training anti-aircraft artillery gunners. The first aircraft in a series of target drones was a modification of the Culver LFA Cadet which eventually led to the PQ-14 series used throughout World War II and beyond.

Design and development
Culver proposed a modification of its civilian Model LFA Cadet which the Army purchased as the PQ-8. The success of the PQ-8 led to the development of the "NRD"; a single PQ-8 was converted to the new configuration and tested by the USAAF as the XPQ-14. Larger and  faster than the PQ-8, the PQ-14 also had retractable landing gear and fuselage, wings and tail components made of wood with stressed plywood skin.

This prototype was followed by YPQ-14A service test aircraft and 1,348 PQ-14A production models. Of the latter, 1,198 were transferred to the US Navy, which designated them as TD2C-1 with the decidedly unattractive name Turkey.

The YPQ-14B was a slightly heavier variant; a total of 25 were produced before production shifted to the PQ-14B. A total of 594 PQ-14Bs  served as target drones for the USAAF. A single PQ-14B was converted to use an O-300-9 engine and designated XPQ-14C. After World War II, the Culver company developed the XPQ-15 from their Model V light aircraft. After only four were delivered the company went bankrupt in 1946.

Operational history

The XPQ-14 was first flown in 1942 and began to be received in training units shortly after. The aircraft was flown unmanned, controlled by radio, but was flown by a pilot for ferry flights, using a rudimentary control panel installed for that purpose and using their parachutes as a seat. Docile and easy to fly, the aircraft was finished in a bright red target color scheme although operationally, a silver or red finish was applied. Without a pilot they were flown from a "mother ship" aircraft. The typical mother ship was a Beech C-45. Despite their short lifespan, the aircraft performed well and the Franklin engine was considered "trouble-free". Most of the Culver target aircraft were "blasted out of the sky" by Army anti-aircraft gunners but a dozen or more survived and were surplused after 1950. Flown as a recreational aircraft, their new owners found that the aircraft had a sprightly performance.

Surviving aircraft 

 44-21895 – PQ-14B airworthy at the Planes of Fame Air Museum in Chino, California.
 44-68334 – PQ-14B on display at the EAA Aviation Museum in Oshkosh, Wisconsin.
 44-68462 – PQ-14B on static display at the National Museum of the United States Air Force in Dayton, Ohio.
 45-59043 – TD2C-1 airworthy with Russ Cronk of Big Bear, California.
 120035 – TD2C-1 in storage at the Paul E. Garber Preservation, Restoration, and Storage Facility of the National Air and Space Museum in Suitland, Maryland.
 N-917 – PQ-14B airworthy at the Airpower Museum in Blakesburg, Iowa.
 PQ-14 under restoration at the Aviation Unmanned Vehicle Museum in Caddo Mills, Texas.
 PQ-14B airworthy with Robert F. Holwey of Colorado Springs, Colorado.

Specifications (Culver PQ-14A)

See also

References

Notes

Bibliography
 
 Mondey, David. American Aircraft of World War II (Hamlyn Concise Guide). London: Bounty Books, 2006. .
 Mormillo, Frank B. "Defenceless Warrior: Culver's PQ-14 Drone." Air Enthusiast Issue 93, May/June 2001.

External links

 Culver PQ-14/Q-14/TD2C
 Culver PQ-14B – National Museum of the United States Air Force

Q-014
1940s United States civil utility aircraft
1940s United States military utility aircraft
Single-engined tractor aircraft
Low-wing aircraft
Target drones of the United States
Aircraft first flown in 1942